Herman Dzumafo Epandi (born 21 February 1980) is a Cameroonian-born Indonesian professional footballer who plays as a striker for Liga 2 club Bekasi City.

Club career

PSPS Pekanbaru
He moved abroad and joined PSPS Pekanbaru in 2007 and quickly became the key player for PSPS Pekanbaru until 2012 when he decided to join Arema Indonesia (ISL). He spent most of his career in Cameroon before moved to Indonesia.
In Indonesia Super League season 2009–2010, he is the most important player for PSPS Pekanbaru's coach, Abdul Rahman Gurning. Together with his duet Muhammad Isnaini, they scored many goals for PSPS Pekanbaru.

Arema Indonesia
On 5 April 2012, he joined Arema Indonesia (ISL). Dzumafo made his league debut on 17 April 2012 in a match against Persipura Jayapura. On 28 April 2012, Dzumafo scored his first goal for Arema Indonesia against Pelita Jaya in the 56th minute at the Kanjuruhan Stadium, Malang.

Persib Bandung 
After a short spell at Arema FC, on 5 October 2012, he signed a contract with Persib Bandung. Dzumafo made his league debut on 13 January 2013 in a match against Persipura Jayapura. On 17 January 2013, Dzumafo scored his first goal for Persib against Persiwa Wamena in the 13th minute at the Siliwangi Stadium, Bandung. In May 2013, Sriwijaya F.C. and Persib Bandung agreed to exchange players. Dzumafo (to Sriwijaya) and Hilton Moreira (to Persib) eventually exchanged.

Sriwijaya (loan) 
In 2013, Dzumafo joined Sriwijaya, on loan from Persib Bandung. He made his debut on 12 May 2013 in a match against Persiram Raja Ampat. On 16 May 2013, Dzumafo scored his first goal for Sriwijaya in the 22nd minute against Persidafon Dafonsoro at the Gelora Sriwijaya Stadium, Palembang.

Mitra Kukar
On 12 February 2014, he signed for Mitra Kukar. Dzumafo made his league debut on 15 February 2014 in a match against Perseru Serui. On 20 February 2014, Dzumafo scored his first goal for Mitra Kukar against Persela Lamongan in the 15th minute at the Aji Imbut Stadium, Tenggarong.

Persegres Gresik
In 2015, Dzumafo joined Persegres Gresik United. He made his debut on 5 April 2015 in a match against Borneo. On 11 April 2015, Dzumafo scored his first goal for Persegres Gresik in the 14th minute against Barito Putera.

PSPS Riau
In 2017, Dzumafo signed a with Liga 2 club PSPS Riau. He made 15 league appearances and scored 11 goals for PSPS.

Bhayangkara FC
On 4 January 2018, he joined Bhayangkara. Dzumafo made his league debut on 31 March 2018 in a match against PSMS Medan. On 31 March 2018, Dzumafo scored his first goal for Bhayangkara against PSMS in the 39th minute at the Teladan Stadium, Medan. He made 65 league appearances and scored 21 goals for Bhayangkara.

Dewa United
In 2021, Dzumafo signed a contract with Indonesian Liga 2 club Dewa United. He made his league debut on 28 September against RANS Cilegon. On 11 October 2021, Dzumafo scored his first goal for Dewa United against Badak Lampung in the 59th minute at the Gelora Bung Karno Madya Stadium, Jakarta.

Return to Bhayangkara
On 5 January 2022, it was confirmed that Dzumafo would re-join Bhayangkara, signing a year contract. He made his league debut in a 3–2 win against Madura United on 14 January 2022 as a substitute for Andik Vermansah in the 84th minute at the Kapten I Wayan Dipta Stadium, Gianyar.

Bekasi City
On 4 June 2022, it was announced that Dzumafo would be joining Bekasi City for the 2022-23 Liga 2 campaign.

Honours

Club 
Dewa United
 Liga 2 third place (play-offs): 2021
Individual
 Premier Division Top Goalscorer: 2008–09 (17 goals)

References

External links 
 
 Herman Dzumafo at ligaindonesiabaru.com

Living people
1980 births
Association football forwards
Expatriate footballers in Indonesia
Cameroonian expatriates in Indonesia
Cameroonian footballers
Liga 1 (Indonesia) players
PSPS Pekanbaru players
Arema F.C. players
Persib Bandung players
Sriwijaya F.C. players
Mitra Kukar players
Persela Lamongan players
Cameroon under-20 international footballers
Naturalised citizens of Indonesia
Dewa United F.C. players
Indonesian people of Cameroonian descent